Strangeloop Networks Inc develops the Strangeloop Site Optimizer software tool. Strangeloop Networks was founded in 2006 by twin brothers Jonathan Bixby and Joshua Bixby, with Richard Campbell, Kent Alstad, and Lee Purvis. The company's first product offering was the Strangeloop AS1000, a delivery-focused accelerator for ASP.NET. Strangeloop Networks is headquartered in Vancouver, British Columbia. Strangeloop Networks was acquired by Radware in February 2013.

References

External links
 Data Center Knowledge: Strangeloop: Accelerating Mere Mortals
 Network World: Speeding web services
 Strangeloop website

Networking software companies
Software companies of Canada
Service-oriented architecture-related products